Marwar Ranawas railway station is a small railway station in Pali district, Rajasthan. Its code is MRWS. It serves Ranawas town. The station consists of two platforms. The platforms are not well sheltered. It lacks many facilities including water and sanitation. It was converted to -wide broad gauge in 1997.

Major trains

 Mavli–Marwar MG Passenger

References

Railway stations in Pali district
Ajmer railway division